A run chart, also known as a run-sequence plot is a graph that displays observed data in a time sequence.  Often, the data displayed represent some aspect of the output or performance of a manufacturing or other business process. It is therefore a form of line chart.

Overview 
Run sequence plots are an easy way to graphically summarize a univariate data set. A common assumption of univariate data sets is that they behave like: 
 random drawings;
 from a fixed distribution;
 with a common location; and
 with a common scale.
With run sequence plots, shifts in location and scale are typically quite evident. Also, outliers can easily be detected.

Examples could include measurements of the fill level of bottles filled at a bottling plant or the water temperature of a dish-washing machine each time it is run.  Time is generally represented on the horizontal (x) axis and the property under observation on the vertical (y) axis.  Often, some measure of central tendency (mean or median) of the data is indicated by a horizontal reference line.

Run charts are analyzed to find anomalies in data that suggest shifts in a process over time or special factors that may be influencing the variability of a process.  Typical factors considered include unusually long "runs" of data points above or below the average line, the total number of such runs in the data set, and unusually long series of consecutive increases or decreases.

Run charts are similar in some regards to the control charts used in statistical process control, but do not show the control limits of the process.  They are therefore simpler to produce, but do not allow for the full range of analytic techniques supported by control charts.

References

Further reading

External links

Run-Sequence Plot

Statistical charts and diagrams
Quality control tools
Technical communication